Piksel is a professional services and technology provider to the broadcast and media industry.

Piksel has worked with clients in the Broadcast and Media industry for over 20 years, from launching Sky Go with BSkyB and 4oD with Channel 4 in 2006, to helping architect and implement OSN. They have created a microservices platform and products built especially for this industry. The company maintains corporate headquarters in York and principal offices in Atlanta, Milan, and across Europe.

Piksel formerly went by the name of KIT digital until filing for bankruptcy in April 2013. Upon emerging from bankruptcy in August 2013, the company changed its name to Piksel.

History
In late 2007, Kaleil Isaza Tuzman purchased a controlling interest in ROO Group and became the company's CEO and chairman of the board. ROO Group changed its name to KIT digital in 2008 after financial restructuring of the company.
 
KIT digital embarked on a growth by acquisition strategy and quickly acquired a number of players in the digital media IP video industry. In 2008 they acquired, Sputnik Agency, Visual Connection, Kamera and Morpheum. In 2009, Narrowstep, Nunet, The FeedRoom and Juzou. KIT digital was listed on the NASDAQ Global Market in August 2009 under the ticker "KITD". The key acquisitions facilitated KIT digital to become one of the largest video software and service providers in the world. In September 2009 KIT digital moved its global headquarters from Dubai, UAE to its European head office and technical operations hub in Prague, Czech Republic, citing the European zone now represented in excess of 50% of the company's revenue stream.

In 2010 the company bought the Atlanta-based live event broadcaster Multicast Media Technologies and later went on to buy more broadcast and media asset management companies including Benchmark Broadcast Systems, Megahertz Broadcast Systems, Accela Communications and Brickbox Digital Media. By October that year, KIT digital was estimated to control 25% of a US$500 million market for Internet video-management software.

In January 2011 they spent approximately $77.2 million to purchase three social software and video companies, Kewego, KickApps, and Kyte and KickApps CEO Alex Blum was appointed to the new position of Global COO of KIT digital to manage worldwide operations. A few months later KIT spent over $100 million to purchase TXT Polymedia for $34.4 million and IT software services company ioko for approximately $74 million in cash and 1,509,805 restricted shares of KIT common stock, totaling $91.4 million.

Subsequent collapse

On November 21, 2012, the company announced errors that will force restatement of prior period financial statements and postponement of Q3 2012 results. The 2009, 2010 and 2011 years and 1Q12 and 2Q12 will be restated; KITD says investors should no longer rely upon previously issued statements for those periods. The company says an event of default exists in a secured loan facility that has $11 million outstanding; that its cash balance has dwindled to $10.6 million, and that cash burn is expected to continue. As a result, KIT is exploring "a broad set of strategic alternatives," including financing deals (virtually guaranteed to be dilutive) and a sale. It's also cancelling its 2012 shareholder meeting. Shares traded more than 50% down in after hours trading. The company announced on December 10, 2012, that it has received notice from NASDAQ, because it has not yet filed 3Q results with the SEC. The company no longer complies with the continued listing requirements under Nasdaq. The NASDAQ stock market announced on December 11, 2012, that trading of NASDAQ:KITD shares was halted.

KITD announced on April 16, 2013, that it would file for bankruptcy on April 24 with a debt plan supported by three of the largest shareholders. The company's last financial statements listed a  revenue of $107.3 million for the six months ended June 30, resulting in a $110.8 million loss from operations, including a $55 million goodwill-impairment charge. Jones Day, with a claim of $1.6 million for legal services, is shown as the largest unsecured creditor. The case is IN RE Chapter 11. KIT Digital, Inc., Case No. 13-11298 U.S. Bankruptcy Court, Southern District of New York (Manhattan).

Isaza Tuzman left KIT digital in April 2012.

Criminal actions
The collapse of KIT Digital led to a number of arrests, broadly alleging that the share price was fraudulently inflated by seeking to buy the company's shares with the company's own money through an investment vehicle controlled by Kaleil Isaza Tuzman. Stephen Maiden was sentenced in February 2015 to seven years in prison. In July 2016 Omar Amanat was arrested as part of the criminal case. Kaleil Isaza Tuzman served time in prison in Colombia and was eventually extradited to the United States.

In December 2017, both Tuzman and Amanat were found guilty of defrauding Kit investors. Tuzman and Amanat had been accused of conspiring to inflate KIT's trading volume and share price between 2008 and 2011 in an effort to hide their devastating losses. The verdict came after six weeks of trial. Three government witnesses who pleaded guilty, including two former KIT executives and a disgraced hedge-fund founder, told jurors of related frauds being directed by Tuzman and Amanat in an effort to hide their disastrous investment losses.

Customers
Piksel's clients have included Airbus, the Associated Press, AT&T, BBC, BSkyB, Disney-ABC, Google, Hewlett-Packard, Mediaset, MTV, News Corp, RSC MediaGroup, Sky Deutschland, Sky Italia, Telecom Argentina, O2, Universal Studios, Verizon, Vodafone, and Volkswagen.

See also
 IPTV
 Broadband TV
 Social TV
 Content management system
 Mobile content

References

External links

Companies formerly listed on the Nasdaq